Lansdowne High School (LHS), formerly known as Lansdowne Sr. High School, and currently known as the Lansdowne High School Academy for Advanced Professional Studies, is a four-year public high school in Baltimore County, Maryland, United States.

About the School
The school is located in the far southwest corner of Baltimore County right near the Baltimore City line.  It is at 3800 Hollins Ferry Road in Lansdowne, Maryland, just west of Maryland Route 295, inside the Baltimore Beltway. It is just south of the Baltimore City neighborhoods of Lakeland and Westport, just north of the Anne Arundel County neighborhood of Linthicum/Linthicum Heights, just east of Arbutus/Halethorpe in Baltimore County, and just west of Baltimore Highlands in Baltimore County and Brooklyn/Brooklyn Park in Baltimore City.

The school district for Lansdowne High School borders the districts of Catonsville High School in Baltimore County and Southern High School, which is now known as Digital Harbor High School in Baltimore City.

Various proposals to renovate or replace the school building were made in 2016 and 2017. County officials budgeted ~$30 million in 2017 to renovate and air condition the facility, but the plan was rejected when parents contended that an entirely new school should instead be considered.

Academics
Lansdowne High school received a 41.8 out of a possible 100 points (41%) on the 2018-2019 Maryland State Department of Education Report Card and received a 2 out of 5 star rating, ranking in the 17th percentile among all Maryland schools.

Students
The 2019–2020 enrollment at Lansdowne High School was 1326 students.

Lansdowne High School Academy has expanded course offerings and attracted new students with arts, technology, finance, and health services magnet programs over the past 10 years, Lansdowne has seen  improvements is graduation rates and test scores.

Student population 

2011   981
2010   978
2009   1,113
2008   1,313
2007 	1,276
2006 	1,281
2005 	1,230
2004 	1,201
2003 	1,171
2002 	1,199
2001 	1,221
2000 	1,210
1999 	1,210
1998 	1,134
1997 	1,116
1996 	1,072
1995 	1,018
1994 	1,065
1993 	1,141

Athletics

State Champions
Girls Basketball
Mildred Haney Murray Sportsmanship Award 1993
Baseball
3A 1993
Softball
Eugene Robertson Sportsmanship Award 2012

Notable alumni
 David Byrne - lead singer of 80's music group Talking Heads
 Adrienne A. Jones - Speaker of the Maryland House of Delegates
 Ned Wilcox - former American football player

Image gallery

References and notes

 See also List of Schools in Baltimore County, Maryland

External links

 
 LHS Televideo YouTube Channel 

Halethorpe, Maryland
Public high schools in Maryland
Baltimore County Public Schools
Educational institutions established in 1963
Middle States Commission on Secondary Schools
1963 establishments in Maryland